The Avery Coonley House, also known as the Coonley House or Coonley Estate was designed by architect Frank Lloyd Wright. Constructed 1908–12, this is a residential estate of several buildings built on the banks of the Des Plaines River in Riverside, Illinois, a suburb of Chicago.  It is itself a National Historic Landmark and is included in another National Historic Landmark, the Riverside Historic District.

History
The Avery Coonley House (built 1908–12) in Riverside, Illinois, is located on a unique small peninsula surrounded by the Des Plaines River. Of the few estates that Frank Lloyd Wright developed, it is one of his largest and most elaborate Prairie School-homes ever built. It is one of just three multi-building prairie complexes built by the famed architect. The other two are the Dana–Thomas House and the Darwin D. Martin House complexes. The Coonley house is also the first example in Wright's work of a zoned plan.  The raised second floor includes three zones: The public area (living room and dining room), the bedroom wing (with its pendant guest wing) and finally the kitchen and servants areas.  The original residence was over-9000-square-feet and built on a ten-acre parcel.  The entrance halls, playroom and sewing room are on the ground floor. An entire complex of interrelated buildings with extensive raised and sunken gardens was designed by landscape architect Jens Jensen. The main structure of the Avery Coonley Estate is the public-living room wing, located on Bloomingbank Road and behind that facing Scottswood Road is the bedroom wing of the mansion. The complex also includes a separate stable-coach house and gardener's cottage (1911). Along with the Robie House, the Coonley Estate represents the maturation of Wright's Prairie Style, typified by wide overhanging eaves, bands of art glass casement windows, free-flowing interior spaces and the harmonious blending of site and structure.

Avery Coonley, a Chicago industrialist and his wife, Queene Ferry of the Detroit-based Ferry Seed Company, were both heirs to industrial fortunes and had an unlimited budget to commission a new residence. The Coonleys had investigated Wright's other homes and told him that they saw in his work "the countenances of principle". Wright stated in his autobiography that "This was to me a great and sincere compliment. So I put my best into the Coonley House." Wright considered the Coonley House among his finest works and gave the Coonleys a residence that blended indoors and out and felt as much like a little village as a home, given the way the courtyards, buildings, and garden walls interconnected. He designed all the features and furnishings within the home, including rugs and textiles. The designs of the Coonley House were included in his 1907 exhibition at the Chicago Architectural Club. Construction began a year later.

A philanthropic couple, The Coonleys had progressive beliefs which included early education for children. At the age of four years, their only daughter Elizabeth was too young to attend the local school. To educate her child and others, Queene Ferry requested that Wright design a kindergarten, the Avery Coonley School Playhouse, in 1912 on nearby Fairbank Road, a block away from the main residence. The art glass windows of the Coonley Playhouse feature one of Frank Lloyd Wright's best known designs. A pattern based on balloons, confetti and American flags, very festive for the intended use of the structure, the design used in these windows was artistically striking and represents Wright's first departure from his signature style using only straight lines. Except for a few relatively plain panes, the windows of the Coonley Playhouse are now all replicas, the originals having been removed in the middle of the 20th century at a time when Wright's work was either being saved or dissected and sold for large sums of money.  Many of the originals can be seen in museums such as the Metropolitan Museum of Art in New York and The Art Institute of Chicago which prominently displays one of the windows near its main entrance. The colored side of the art glass windows faced the inside of the house, while the side that faces exterior is white. The kindergarten school moved from the Coonley Playhouse in Riverside to a larger facility in Downers Grove in 1916 and eventually became a full K-8 elementary school and still exists today. The original Coonley Playhouse near the estate in Riverside is currently a private residence.

Alterations to the Coonley Estate have been made through the years, by Wright and others. A year after the house was completed, Wright modified the terrace pavilion, adding bands of art glass doors and windows to allow more light into the second-floor living room and children's playroom below. A pergola with noticeable Asian influences was also added. Avery Coonley sold the house in 1921 to Peter Kroehler, a furniture manufacturer from Naperville, Illinois. Several architectural changes were made during this period including a sun-room addition to the south, the lily pond was converted into a swimming pool and a pool house was added - probably designed by Harry Robinson, an apprentice under Wright at both Oak Park and Taliesin. 
In 1952 the property was threatened with demolition to make way for 14 ranch homes. A compromise was reached that allowed developer Arnold Skow to divide the main house into north and south halves by inserting a firewall, build five new houses on the property and convert the gardener's cottage and stable into separate residences and addresses. The raised gardens were sold off and a modern house was built on the property. Even with these radical changes, the house retains nearly all of its original exterior and interior design details, including approximately 270 original art glass windows and doors.

A heater for the swimming pool exploded on June 11, 1978, setting a fire that destroyed the living room of the main house and one of the bedrooms. In 2000 salvage and restoration work was performed on light screens and millwork on the north half of the house including stucco and roof repair, restoration of the original gravel driveway and the reconversion of the swimming pool back to the original lily pond.  The entire north side of the house has been meticulously restored to its original splendor including the re-creation of the George Mann Niedecken living room mural as well as the decorative tulip designed tile frieze along with many light screens that surround the perimeter of the house.

During his lifetime, Frank Lloyd Wright built approximately 532 homes, museums, and office buildings. Many have been demolished, but more than 400 Wright-designed buildings still stand. Of the approximately 2,500 NHLs in the United States, twenty-eight were designed by Wright. Included is The Avery Coonley House which is the largest privately owned Frank Lloyd Wright residence to be recognized by the United States Secretary of the Interior. It was declared a National Historic Landmark in 1970.

The village of Riverside, founded in 1869 as the nation's first planned community, was designed by landscape architect Frederick Law Olmsted – designer of both Central Park in New York City and Jackson Park (fairgrounds of the Chicago Columbian Exposition of 1893). The streets of Riverside wind and crisscross, forming small islands of houses and green space; quite a contrast to the strict grid of nearby Chicago.

See also
The Avery Coonley School
List of National Historic Landmarks in Illinois
National Register of Historic Places listings in Cook County, Illinois

References

 Storrer, William Allin. The Frank Lloyd Wright Companion. University Of Chicago Press, 2006,  (S.135)

External links

 Facebook: Coonley House Bedroom Wing
 A site about The Coonley House
 A site about the Coonley Playhouse
 Avery Coonley School, located in Downers Grove, IL founded by the Coonleys

Frank Lloyd Wright buildings
Houses completed in 1912
Houses on the National Register of Historic Places in Cook County, Illinois
National Historic Landmarks in Illinois
Riverside, Illinois
1912 establishments in Illinois
Historic district contributing properties in Illinois